Doublesex and mab-3 related transcription factor 1, also known as DMRT1, is a protein which in humans is encoded by the DMRT1 gene.

Function 

DMRT1 is a dose sensitive transcription factor protein that regulates Sertoli cells and germ cells. The DMRT1 gene is located at the end of the 9th chromosome. This gene is found in a cluster with two other members of the gene family, having in common a zinc finger-like DNA-binding motif (DM domain). The DM domain is an ancient, conserved component of the vertebrate sex-determining pathway that is also a key regulator of male development in flies and nematodes, and is found to be the key sex-determining factor in chickens. 
The majority of DMRT1 protein is located in the testicular cord and Sertoli cells, with a small amount in the germ cells.

This gene exhibits a gonad-specific and sexually dimorphic expression pattern, just like the related doublesex gene in fruit flies. Defective testicular development and XY feminization occur when this gene is hemizygous.
Two copies of the DMRT1 gene are required for normal sexual development. When a DMRT1 gene is lost, the most common disease is chromosome 9p deletion, which causes abnormal testicular formation and feminization. The DMRT1 gene is critical for male sex determination; without this gene the default female characteristic takes over and male characteristic is slight or non-existent.

When DMRT1 is knocked out in mice, the mice showed changes in both Sertoli and germ cells soon after formation of the gonadal ridge. The main defects associated with DMRT1 knockout were developmental arrest, excess proliferation of germ cells, and failure to undergo meiosis, mitosis, or migration. Thus, the knockout model shows that loss of the DMRT1 gene is associated with incomplete germ cell development leading to infertility, abnormal testicular formation, and/or feminization of the affected individual. Induced knockout of DMRT1 in adult male mice has been found to cause transdifferentiation of somatic cells in the testis to the equivalent cell types that would ordinarily be found in the ovary.  Conversely, conditional expression of DMRT1 in the gonad of female mice caused the apparent transdifferentiation of ovarian somatic (granulosa) cells to the equivalent cell type (Sertoli) ordinarily found in males.

References

 Anthony D. Krentza,b, Mark W. Murphya, Shinseog Kima,1, Matthew S. Cookc, Blanche Capelc, Rui Zhud, Angabin Matind, Aaron L. Sarvere, Keith L. Parkerf, Michael D. Griswoldg, Leendert H. J. Looijengah, Vivian J. Bardwella and David Zarkower. "The DM Domain Protein DMRT1 Is a Dose-sensitive Regulator of Fetal Germ Cell Proliferation and Pluripotency." The DM Domain Protein DMRT1 Is a Dose-sensitive Regulator of Fetal Germ Cell Proliferation and Pluripotency. PNAS, 29 Oct. 2009. Web. 12 Mar. 2014.
 Christopher S. Raymond1, Emily D. Parker2, Jae R. Kettlewell1, Laura G. Brown3, David C. Page3, Kamila Kusz4, Jadwiga Jaruzelska4, Yuri Reinberg5, Wendy L. Flejter6, Vivian J. Bardwell1,2, Betsy Hirsch7 and David Zarkower1. "Human Molecular Genetics." A Region of Human Chromosome 9p Required for Testis Development Contains Two Genes Related to Known Sexual Regulators. Oxford Journal, n.d. Web. 28 Feb. 2014.
 Craig A. Smith, Kelly N. Roeszler, Thomas Ohnesorg, David M. Cummins, Peter G. Farlie, Timothy J. Doran & Andrew H. Sinclair. "The Avian Z-linked Gene DMRT1 Is Required for Male Sex Determination in the Chicken." Nature.com. Nature, 26 Aug. 2009. Web. 12 Mar. 2014.
 "DMRT1 Gene." - GeneCards. Crown Human Genome Center, Department of Molecular Genetics, the Weizmann Institute of Science,http://genome.ucsc.edu/. 23 Oct. 2013. Web. 12 Mar. 2014.
 Ning Lei, Kaori I. Hornbaker, Daren A. Rice, Tatiana Karpova, Valentine A. Agbor, and Leslie L. Heckert. "Sex-specific Differences in Mouse DMRT1 Expression Are Both Cell Type- and Stage-dependent during Gonad Development." Sex-specific Differences in Mouse DMRT1 Expression Are Both Cell Type- and Stage-dependent during Gonad Development. NIH Public Access, 13 June 2007. Web. 12 Mar. 2014.

Further reading

 *1.	A region of human chromosome 9p required for testis development contains two genes related to known sexual regulators. (PubMed id 10332030)1, 2, 3, 9 Raymond C.S.... Zarkower D. (1999)
 2.	Evidence for evolutionary conservation of sex-determining genes. (PubMed id 9490411)1, 2, 3, 9 Raymond C.S....Zarkower D. (1998)
 3.	Variants near DMRT1, TERT and ATF7IP are associated with testicular germ cell cancer. (PubMed id 20543847)1, 2, 4 Turnbull C....Rahman N. (2010)
 4.	Transcriptional diversity of DMRT1 (dsx- and mab3-related transcription factor 1) in human testis. (PubMed id 16617334)1, 2, 9 Cheng H.H....Zhou R.J. (2006)
 5.	A new submicroscopic deletion that refines the 9p region for sex reversal. (PubMed id 10857744)1, 2, 9 Calvari V.... Guioli S. (2000)
 6.	A second independent locus within DMRT1 is associated with testicular germ cell tumor susceptibility. (PubMed id 21551455)1, 4 Kanetsky P.A....Nathanson K.L. (2011)
 7.	Personalized smoking cessation: interactions between nicotine dose, dependence and quit-success genotype score. (PubMed id 20379614)1, 4 Rose J.E....Uhl G.R. (2010)
 8.	DNA sequence and analysis of human chromosome 9. (PubMed id 15164053)1, 2 Humphray S.J.... Dunham I. (2004)
 9.	The status, quality, and expansion of the NIH full-length cDNA project: the Mammalian Gene Collection (MGC). (PubMed id 15489334)1,2 Gerhard D.S....Malek J. (2004)
 10.	The DM domain protein DMRT1 is a dose-sensitive regul ator of fetal germ cell proliferation and pluripotency. (PubMed id 20007774)1, 9 Krentz A.D....Zarkower D. (2009)

External links 
 
https://web.archive.org/web/20110720091853/http://www.dmrt1.umn.edu/
 

Transcription factors